Adrian von Ziegler (born 25 December 1989) is a Swiss composer from Zürich. He gained popularity on the video-sharing website YouTube, where his channel has over 1,000,000 subscribers as of May 2021. He composes instrumental music with a variety of Celtic Music, Emotional Music, Relaxing Music, Dark Music, Oriental Music, Fantasy Music, Movie Scores, Metal and many other genres.  Adrian von Ziegler started using a "very old keyboard" and Magix Music Maker to compose his music. He still has this keyboard, but now mainly uses Cubase. Although there are few signs of media attention, von Ziegler was featured in a Magix magazine article in 2012.

Musical career debut 
At age 15, von Ziegler began his musical experience as a drummer in a local rock band. However, wanting more melodic expression, he quit the band and started to compose music independently, using only a headset microphone and guitar.

From 2007 to 2009, he recorded countless demo songs under the artist name "Indigo", in which his guitar would get replaced increasingly often by keyboard and orchestral arrangements of which he grew to favor. In 2008, he began releasing music on the social networking site Myspace.

After dropping the Indigo pseudonym in 2009, he began releasing music under his own name, starting with the albums Requiem and Lifeclock in 2010.

Discography

Style and inspiration 

Much of von Ziegler's music is characterized by traditional and orchestral instrumentation, digitally composed and synthesized. He states that his inspiration originates from a variety of sources, including  Celtic and  Norse mythology, movie and video game soundtracks, and fantasy literature. He attributes his orchestral style to the influence of composers such as Hans Zimmer, Koji Kondo, and Jeremy Soule.

He also notes that his emotions, natural surroundings, imaginary worlds, and wife all give him inspiration for his musical works.

Other achievements 
In 2021, von Ziegler released a 400-page dictionary describing Inra, a constructed language he developed over 10 years and which often features in his music. As of its release, the publication contained:

 Dictionary of over 20,000 words and terms (276 pages)
 Grammar section and conjugation charts (81 pages)
 Name section, with over 1,000 Inra personal names and their meanings (25 pages)
 Proverb section (currently in the beginning stage)
 Etymology section (currently in the beginning stage)

References

Additional sources

External links 
 Adrian von Ziegler's channel on YouTube

1989 births
Living people
Musicians from Zürich
Swiss composers
Swiss male composers
Fantasy music